Gerhard Petrus Lotter (born 3 January 1993) is a Namibian cricketer and rugby union player.

Rugby career

In rugby union, Lotter usually plays as a hooker, but can also play as an eighth man. He currently plays for Namibian side  in the South African Currie Cup qualification series and for Windhoek-based amateur side Wanderers in the Premier League.

He represented  in rugby at youth level since primary school level, as he was included in the Namibia squad that participated at the South African primary schools tournament, the Under-13 Craven Week, held in George in 2006. He was named the captain of the side and scored Namibia's only points in both a 5–38 defeat to Border and a 10–10 draw with  during the competition.

He was also selected to represent Namibia at high school level, playing for them as an eighth man at the 2010 Under-18 Craven Week tournament held in Welkom. He scored two tries – similar to four years earlier, these came in matches against Border Country Districts and Zimbabwe – in their three matches at the tournament. He returned to play in the same competition in 2011, this time held in Kimberley, reverting to his role as a hooker and again scoring a try in their match against Zimbabwe in a 55–18 victory.

He captained the Namibia Under-19 side that won the 2012 African Rugby Under-19 Cup in Zimbabwe, and also represented the Namibia Under-20 side that played at the 2013 IRB Junior World Rugby Trophy held in Chile.

Cricket career

Having made his debut for the side in a miscellaneous match against a Zimbabwe A side, Lotter made his List A debut for the side during the 2009–2010 season, against Gauteng. He did not bat or bowl in the match.

In August 2009, he played for the Under-17 Namibia squad.

External links
 Gert Lotter at Cricket Archive

References

1993 births
Living people
Cricketers from Windhoek
Namibian cricketers
Namibian rugby union players
People educated at Windhoek High School
Rugby union players from Windhoek
Rugby union number eights